William Hood (born 3 November 1914, date of death unknown) was a Northern Irish footballer who played as a defender. Hood made three appearances for Liverpool during the 1937–38 season as a replacement for the injured full back Tom Cooper. Hood also played for Cliftonville and Derry City in his native Northern Ireland.

References

1914 births
Year of death missing
English Football League players
Association footballers from Northern Ireland
Cliftonville F.C. players
Derry City F.C. players
Liverpool F.C. players
Northern Ireland amateur international footballers
Association footballers from Belfast
Association football defenders